Manningham may refer to:

Places
Manningham, South Australia, a north eastern suburb of Adelaide
City of Manningham in Victoria, Australia
Manningham, Bradford, in West Yorkshire, England
Manningham Road in Victoria, Australia

Other uses
Manningham (surname)
Manningham F.C., rugby league team who switched to association football in 1903 and became Bradford City A.F.C.